Steve Johnson may refer to:

Sports

American football
 Steve Johnson (coach) (born 1956), American football coach
 Steve Johnson (tight end) (born 1965), American football player
 Stevie Johnson (born 1986), American football wide receiver

Other sports
 Steve Johnson (Australian footballer) (born 1983), Australian Football League player
 Steve Johnson (baseball) (born 1987), Major League Baseball pitcher
 Steve Johnson (basketball) (born 1957), American former National Basketball Association player
 Stevie Johnson (basketball) (born 1978), American basketball player who played overseas
 Steve Johnson (cricketer) (born 1944), former English cricketer
 Steve Johnson (English footballer) (born 1957), former footballer
 Steve Johnson (rugby union), former Leicester Tigers and England blindside flanker
 Steve Johnson (tennis) (born 1989), American tennis player

Other people
 Steve Johnson (AOL), former AOL vice-president
 Steve Johnson (Colorado politician) (born 1960), member of the Colorado State Senate
 Steve Johnson (director) (born 1972), English film director
 Steve Johnson (Michigan politician), member of the Michigan House of Representatives
 Steve Johnson (special effects artist) (born 1960), American special effects artist

Characters
 Steve Johnson (Days of Our Lives), a character on Days of Our Lives

See also
 Steven Johnson (disambiguation)
 Stephen Johnson (disambiguation)
 Stefan Johansson (born 1956), former Formula One driver from Sweden
 Steve Johnston (born 1971), Australian international motorcycle speedway rider
 Stevens–Johnson syndrome